To Scale the Scales of Justice is a 2010 marble sculpture by M.J. Anderson, installed outside the Justice Building in Salem, Oregon, United States.

See also

 2010 in art

References

External links
 

2010 establishments in Oregon
2010 sculptures
Marble sculptures in Oregon
Outdoor sculptures in Salem, Oregon
Statues in Oregon